Bay St. Louis station is a closed Amtrak intercity train station in Bay St. Louis, Mississippi, which served the Sunset Limited. The Bay St. Louis station consists of two small platforms with indoor/outdoor shelters near the former Louisville & Nashville Railroad Depot, which was built in 1929, but is closed to the public.

Former Louisville & Nashville services which utilized their station included the Pan-American, Gulf Wind, and Humming Bird. Into the latter 1960s the Southern Railway's Crescent and Piedmont Limited also used this station.

Amtrak service began with the Gulf Coast Limited, which operated between 1984 and 1985 and called at the station. The stop was reactivated on March 31, 1993 in service on the Sunset Limited. Damage to the rail line resulting from Hurricane Katrina in 2005 caused Amtrak to suspend service east of New Orleans, including at Bay St. Louis. In anticipation of restored service, Amtrak began construction of a new Americans With Disabilities Act-compliant platform in 2022.

Notable places nearby
John C. Stennis Space Center

References

External links

Amtrak Stations Database
Image of former L&N Station

Former Amtrak stations in Mississippi
Buildings and structures in Hancock County, Mississippi
Former Louisville and Nashville Railroad stations
Mississippi Landmarks
1929 establishments in Mississippi
Railway stations in the United States opened in 1929
Railway stations closed in 1971
Railway stations in the United States opened in 1984
Railway stations closed in 1985
Railway stations in the United States opened in 1993
Railway stations closed in 2005